The 1895 Rutgers Queensmen football team represented Rutgers University as an independent during the 1895 college football season. In their first and only season under head coach H. W. Ambruster, the Queensmen compiled a 3–4 record and were outscored by their opponents, 131 to 98. The team captain was William A. Ranney.

Schedule

References

Rutgers
Rutgers Scarlet Knights football seasons
Rutgers Queensmen football